Dinonemertidae is a family of worms belonging to the order Polystilifera.

Genera:
 Alexandronemertes Chernyshev, 1992
 Dinonemertes Laidlaw, 1906
 Paradinonemertes Brinkmann, 1915
 Planonemertes Coe, 1926
 Plionemertes Coe, 1926
 Tubonemertes Coe, 1954

References

Polystilifera
Nemertea families